Nothocastoreum is a fungal genus in the Mesophelliaceae family. The genus is monotypic, containing the single truffle-like species Nothocastoreum cretaceum, found in Australia.

References

External links
 

Fungi of Australia
Hysterangiales
Monotypic Basidiomycota genera
Truffles (fungi)